The Kahului Railroad (KHRR) was formerly a common carrier railway company in Hawaii (United States). It operated on  narrow gauge track  in length from Wailuku to Kuiaha on the north coast of the island of Maui. The company continues today as Kahului Trucking & Storage. It continues to be a subsidiary of Alexander & Baldwin.

History

After the US government of the Hawaiian government had allowed sugar to be exported duty-free in 1876, the sugar industry experienced a strong upswing. The head of the postal authority of Kahului, Thomas H. Hobron, saw the need to transport the sugar quickly to the ports and opened already on 17 July 1879 a railway line from Wailuku to the harbor in Kahului under the name Kahului and Wailuku Railroad. The first passenger train ran on 29 July 1879. In September 1879, the construction was completed on this section. The track was the first public railway in the Kingdom of Hawaii. Scheduled mixed trains operated from Tuesday to Friday. On 21 September 1880, the extension to Pa'ia was opened. From 1 July 1881 rail operations operated under the name Kahului Railroad .

From 1884, the branch to Spreckelsville was in operation. From 1894 until the annexation of the archipelago by the United States in 1899, the web used its own stamps for the transport of mail that were produced by the US Postal Service. In 1899, the railroad was acquired by the Hawaiian Commercial & Sugar Co. In 1906, the railway company built from the port of Kahului.

The line was extended again on 8 February 1913. The railway crossed the Maliko Gorge via a steel bridge to reach Ha'ikū and Kuiaha. The bridge was with a height of  230 ft (70 m) above the valley floor the highest railway bridge in Hawaii, and had a length of 682 ft (208 m).

The railway was from 1959, the last public railway in the state of Hawai'i and after a total of almost 87 years, the organisation with the longest operating time. In 1962, Hawaiian Commercial & Sugar was acquired by Alexander & Baldwin. It was decommissioned on 22 May 1966, and subsequently degraded. The Maliko bridge was demolished. The tracks and some vehicles were used for the construction of Lahaina, Kaanapali and Pacific Railroad, a tourist train in the west of the island. The company continues today as Kahului Trucking & Storage. It continues to be a subsidiary of Alexander & Baldwin.

Surviving Rolling Stock
,  B-3-E-class oil-fueled locomotive No. 12, built in 1928 by Baldwin Locomotive Works, Philadelphia, builder's plate #60690. Now operated by the Georgetown Loop Railroad, Georgetown, Colorado.

References

External links
Kahului Trucking & Storage website

Defunct Hawaii railroads
3 ft gauge railways in the United States
Narrow gauge railroads in Hawaii
Railway companies established in 1879
Railway companies disestablished in 1966
1879 establishments in Hawaii
1966 disestablishments in Hawaii
Alexander & Baldwin